Microzogus is a genus of death-watch and spider beetles in the family Ptinidae. There are at least two described species in Microzogus.

Species
These two species belong to the genus Microzogus:
 Microzogus insolens Fall, 1905
 Scymnuseutheca apicalis Pic, 1909

References

Further reading

 
 
 

Bostrichoidea
Articles created by Qbugbot